Animal is the third and most recent studio album by Australian post-grunge band Motor Ace, released in August 2005. The album peaked at number 21 on the ARIA Charts. The commercial failure of the album prompted Motor Ace to officially disband by the end of 2005.

Singles
The album spawned two singles, "Tomorrow's Gone" was released in June 2005 and peaked at number 41 on the ARIA singles chart. "A little Closer" was released in September 2005 and peaked at number 99 on the ARIA chart.

Track listing 
 "Want You" – 3:59
 "The Time, the Place" – 4:24
 "A Little Closer" – 5:24
 "Not So Blue" – 3:31
 "Ordinary Day" – 4:49
 "Tomorrow's Gone" – 4:07
 "The Winning Streak" – 5:02
 "You'll Fall" – 5:07
 "In Space" – 4:36
 "No Place to Go" – 5:58

Charts

Personnel 
 Patrick Robertson - guitar, piano, lead vocal, programming
 Damian Costin - drums, percussion
 Matt Balfe - bass, guitar, background vocals
 Dave Ong - guitar, background vocals

References

External links 
 

2005 albums
Motor Ace albums